1st Rank Raju may refer to:
1st Rank Raju (2015 film), a Kannada film
1st Rank Raju (2019 film), a Telugu film